Frank Dittrich (born 23 December 1967) is a German former speed skater. His specialties were the stayer distances.

Biography
Frank Dittrich was an excellent skater on the stayer distances 5000 and 10,000 meters. During several World Single Distance Championships for Men Dittrich won five bronze medals, he also won a bronze medal at the World Championships Allround of 1997 in Nagano.

Personal bests

Result

- = No participation
 # NC = not qualified for the final distance, but as # listed in the final ranking
Source: SpeedSkatingStats.com

Medals

References

External links
 
 
 Frank Dittrich at SpeedSkatingStats.com

1967 births
Living people
German male speed skaters
Olympic speed skaters of Germany
Sportspeople from Leipzig
Speed skaters at the 1992 Winter Olympics
Speed skaters at the 1994 Winter Olympics
Speed skaters at the 1998 Winter Olympics
Speed skaters at the 2002 Winter Olympics
World Allround Speed Skating Championships medalists